The ninth season of the Australian police-drama Blue Heelers premiered on the Seven Network on 13 February 2002 and aired on Wednesday nights at 8:30 pm. The 40-episode season concluded 20 November 2002.

Casting

Main cast for this season consisted of:
 John Wood as Senior Sergeant Tom Croydon [full season]
 Julie Nihill as Christine 'Chris' Riley [full season]
 Martin Sacks as Senior Detective Patrick Joseph 'P.J.' Hasham [full season]
 Paul Bishop as Senior Constable Benjamin 'Ben' Stewart [full season]
 Jane Allsop as Constable Jo Parrish [full season]
 Caroline Craig as Sergeant Tess Gallagher [full season]
 Ditch Davey as Constable Evan Jones [full season]

Notable guest actors this season included Ailsa Piper, Alan David Lee, John Orcsik, Leslie Dayman, Margot Knight, Justine Saunders, Jane Badler, Elspeth Ballantyne, Peter Sumner, Shaunna O'Grady, Kate Jason, Alethea McGrath, Marg Downey, Monica Maughan, Lois Collinder and Annie Jones.

Reception

the show really started to decline around this season from its usual 2.5 million down to 1.9 million and it continues to decrease

Awards

Episodes

DVD release 
Season 9 Parts 1 and 2 was released on 3 November 2009.

References

General
 Zuk, T. Blue Heelers: 2002 episode guide, Australian Television Information Archive. Retrieved 1 August 2007.
 TV.com editors. Blue Heelers Episode Guide - Season 9, TV.com. Retrieved 1 August 2007.
Specific

Blue Heelers seasons
2002 Australian television seasons